The discography of American rapper NLE Choppa consists of one studio album, one extended play, three mixtapes, thirty-nine singles, and 24 music videos.

NLE Choppa's debut EP and debut project, Cottonwood, was released on December 23, 2019. His debut studio album, Top Shotta, was released on August 7, 2020. His debut mixtape, From Dark to Light, was released on November 1, 2020, which was his 18th birthday. He has several singles that have entered the Billboard Hot 100, such as "Shotta Flow" and "Walk Em Down", the latter featuring fellow American rapper Roddy Ricch.

Albums

Studio albums

Mixtapes

Extended plays

Singles

As lead artist

As featured artist

Other charted songs

Guest appearances

Notes

References 

Discographies of American artists
Hip hop discographies